Devalokam may refer to:

 Devaloka, the world of gods in Hindu mythology
 Devalokam, a neighborhood of Kottayam, Kerala, India
 Devalokam (film), a 1979 unfinished Malayalam film